The Little Rock Rangers Soccer Club is an American soccer team based in Little Rock, Arkansas. The team was founded in 2016 and played its inaugural season in 2016. The team plays in the USL League Two, a national semi-professional league at the fourth tier of the American Soccer Pyramid. In 2016, the club added a team for the Women's Premier Soccer League (WPSL), a league at the second tier of women's soccer in the United States soccer pyramid, playing their inaugural season in 2017. The team plays its home games at War Memorial Stadium in Little Rock.

About 
The Little Rock Rangers were accepted to play in the National Premier Soccer League (NPSL) in 2015 and in 2016 the Women's Premier Soccer League (WPSL). In 2018, the Rangers had a 7–3 season and qualified for the 2019 Open Cup, "the nation’s oldest and most prestigious tournament." The team is mostly made up of high school and college-aged players, therefore the team is entirely amateur in order to preserve the college players' NCAA eligibility. The Little Rock Rangers Soccer Club is a 501(c)3 non-profit corporation and has a goal of improving soccer in the greater central Arkansas area by bringing in top-quality players and coaches. The Little Rock Rangers Academy, run by the club, provides opportunities for children 4 to 16 to develop their soccer skills with coaching from the first team staff and players. The club also has a goal of being able to provide local soccer club scholarships to underprivileged but motivated children in the area. It does this through extra revenue from ticket sales and donations received.

Crest 
The deer and pine tree is a representation of all that is natural in the state of Arkansas. The white tail deer is the Arkansas state mammal and the loblolly pine is the state tree. The number "16" represents the year that the club started playing in the NPSL and it also represents the sixteen founders of the Little Rock Rangers Soccer Club.

Stadium 
"Home matches are held at War Memorial Stadium, a multi-purpose stadium in Little Rock. Built in 1948, the stadium is home to the Arkansas Baptist Buffaloes, Catholic High School Rockets, and on occasion the University of Arkansas Razorbacks. The stadium also hosts the Delta Classic and Arkansas Activities Association high school championship games. The facility has undergone numerous renovations and features a FieldTurf playing surface and a capacity of 54,120."

Staff 

Coaching Staff
 Men's Head Coach- Adriano Versari
 Men's Assistant Coach - Chris Murphy
 Men's Goalkeeper Coach - Dylan Perdue

Business Staff
President/General Manager- Jonathan Wardlaw
Vice President of Operations- Jason Rector
Technical Director - Ante Jazic
Media and Communication - Trent Eskola

Season-By-Season

Results

Men's

Women's

Record

Men's

Women's

References

External links 
 

2016 establishments in Arkansas
Association football clubs established in 2016
Soccer clubs in Arkansas
National Premier Soccer League teams
Sports in Little Rock, Arkansas